The Handball events at the 1973 All-Africa Games were held in Lagos, Nigeria in January 1973. The competition included only men's event.

Qualified teams

Squads

Group stage
All times are local (UTC+1).

Group A

Group B

Knockout stage

Semifinals

Third place match

Final

Final standing

References

 
1973 All-Africa Games
1973
African Games